The second season of the American comedy-drama television series Orange Is the New Black premiered on Netflix on June 6, 2014, at 12:00 am PST in multiple countries. It consists of thirteen episodes, each between 51–60 minutes, with a 90-minute finale. The series is based on Piper Kerman's memoir, Orange Is the New Black: My Year in a Women's Prison (2010), about her experiences at FCI Danbury, a minimum-security federal prison. The series is created and adapted for television by Jenji Kohan. 

The series follows Piper Chapman, forced to board a bus and a plane without being given any information. Later she discovers that she is in Chicago to testify in the trial of Alex's drug boss, Kubra Balik, and that the stay is temporary. Meanwhile, in Litchfield Penitentiary, a new inmate is rising to power into the prison, by manipulating other inmates and taking control of the drug contraband. Threatened by this new inmate, Red goes to war, to protect her family and her power. 

Orange is the New Black received critical acclaim. The series received numerous accolades including: Producers Guild of America Award for Best Episodic Comedy and Screen Actors Guild Award for Outstanding Performance by an Ensemble in a Comedy Series. Uzo Aduba performance was awarded with the Screen Actors Guild Award for Outstanding Performance by a Female Actor in a Comedy Series and a Primetime Emmy Award for Outstanding Supporting Actress in a Drama Series. The second season was nominated to several Emmys: Outstanding Drama Series, Outstanding Guest Actor in a Drama Series (Pablo Schreiber) and Outstanding Casting for a Drama Series. The series was nominated for the 72nd Golden Globe Awards for Best Television Series – Musical or Comedy, meanwhile Taylor Schilling was nominated for Best Actress – Television Series Musical or Comedy and Uzo Aduba for Best Supporting Actress – Series, Miniseries or Television Film. Lorraine Toussaint won a Best Supporting Actress in a Drama Series.

Episodes

Cast and characters

Main cast

 Taylor Schilling as Piper Chapman, inmate
 Uzo Aduba as Suzanne "Crazy Eyes" Warren, inmate
 Danielle Brooks as Tasha "Taystee" Jefferson, inmate
 Michael Harney as Sam Healy, correctional officer
 Natasha Lyonne as Nicky Nichols, inmate
 Taryn Manning as Tiffany "Pennsatucky" Doggett, inmate
 Kate Mulgrew as Galina "Red" Reznikov, inmate
 Jason Biggs as Larry Bloom, Piper's fiancé

Recurring cast

Inmates

Production
On June 27, 2013, prior to the series premiere, Netflix renewed the show for a second season consisting of 13 episodes. Jenji Kohan stated that the story for the second season would focus less on Piper Chapman and more in the cast as a whole. For the second season, Uzo Aduba, Taryn Manning, Danielle Brooks, and Natasha Lyonne were promoted to series regulars. Laura Prepon did not return as a series regular for a second season because of scheduling conflicts. In July, it was announced that Lorraine Toussaint had joined the cast in a recurring role. Toussaint said of the role: "Jenji has written one of the more complex characters I've ever played, and probably one of the more difficult characters I've played. I think it'll be interesting seeing how this character is received, because Jenji has written a character that plays and enjoys the game, and is incredibly engaging and draws people into her, into the big game and has, I have a great deal of fun." It was revealed that Lori Petty would have a guest role. In February 2014, Netflix revealed that the season was to be released on June 6, 2014.

Reception

Critical reception
The second season received critical acclaim, many praising Toussaint's performance as Vee. Rotten Tomatoes gave a rating of 98%, with an average rating of 9.1 out of 10 based on 42 reviews. The site's critical consensus reads: "With a talented ensemble cast bringing life to a fresh round of serial drama, Orange Is the New Black's sophomore season lives up to its predecessor's standard for female-led television excellence. Metacritic gave the second season a score of 89 out of 100 based on 31 critics, indicating "universal acclaim." David Wiegland of the San Francisco Chronicle gave the season a positive review, calling the first six episodes "not only as great as the first season, but arguably better."

Critics' top ten lists
Orange Is the New Black was considered one of the best shows of the year by many critics and journalists.

 2nd – The Star-Ledger
 3rd – Akron Beacon Journal
 3rd – HitFix  (Dan Fienberg)
 3rd – Indiewire'''
 3rd – Las Vegas Weekly 3rd – Pittsburgh Post-Gazette 3rd – Tampa Bay Times 3rd – Village Voice 4th – Paste 4th – PopMatters 4th – Time 4th – Us Weekly 5th – Denver Post 5th – Uncle Barky 6th – The Daily Beast 6th – HitFix  (Alan Sepinwall)
 6th – NPR 6th – Sioux City Journal 7th – The Hollywood Reporter 7th – San Jose Mercury News 7th – Vox 8th – Slate 8th – Thompson on Hollywood! 9th – Digital Spy 10th – Washington Post – Huffington Post – Philadelphia Daily News – ScreenCrush''

Broadcast
In Australia, the second season began airing on Showcase on July 16, 2014.

References

External links
 
 

Orange Is the New Black
2014 American television seasons